The culture of Turkey combines a heavily diverse and heterogeneous set of elements that have been derived from the various cultures of the Eastern European, Eastern Mediterranean, Caucasian, Middle East and Central Asian traditions. Many of these traditions were initially brought together by the Ottoman Empire, a multi-ethnic and multi-religious state spanning across Central Europe, Eastern Europe, the Middle East and North Africa.

During the early years of the Republic of Turkey, established after the collapse of the Ottoman Empire, the government invested large sums of resources into fine arts such as architecture and sculpture, and other artistic fields around the country in-line with the newly implemented reformist and West-leaning policies. This was done as part of a process of modernization, westernization, and of creating and outlining a new Turkish cultural identity, rather than the previously established and depicted Ottoman identity.

People

History
The Ottoman system was a multi-ethnic state that enabled people within it not to mix with each other and thereby retain separate ethnic and religious identities within the empire (albeit with a dominant Turkish and Southern European ruling class). Upon the fall of the empire after World War I the Turkish Republic adopted a unitary approach, which leads the different cultures within its borders to mix with each other with the aim of producing a national and cultural identity. A series of radical reforms soon followed, central to these reforms were the belief that Turkish society would have to Westernize itself both politically and culturally in order to modernize. Political, legal, religious, cultural, social, and economic policy changes were designed to convert the new Republic of Turkey into a secular, modern nation-state. These changes were implemented under the leadership of Mustafa Kemal Atatürk.

Literature

 
Turkish literature is the collection of written and oral texts composed in the Turkish language, either in its Ottoman form or in less exclusively literary forms, such as that spoken in the Republic of Turkey today. Traditional examples for Turkish folk literature include stories of Karagöz and Hacivat, Keloğlan, İncili Çavuş and Nasreddin Hoca, as well as the works of folk poets such as Yunus Emre and Aşık Veysel. The Book of Dede Korkut and the Epic of Köroğlu have been the main elements of the Turkish epic tradition in Anatolia for several centuries.

The two primary streams of Ottoman literature were poetry and prose. Of the two, the Ottoman Divan poetry, a highly ritualized and symbolic art form, was the dominant stream. The vast majority of Divan poetry was lyric in nature: either ghazals or qasidas. There were, however, other common genres, most particularly the mathnawi (also known as mesnevî), a kind of verse romance and thus a variety of narrative poetry. The tradition of Ottoman prose was exclusively non-fictional in nature; as the fiction tradition was limited to narrative poetry.

The Tanzimat reforms of 1839–1876 brought changes to the language of Ottoman written literature and introduced previously unknown Western genres, primarily the novel and the short story. Many of the writers in the Tanzimat period wrote in several different genres simultaneously: for instance, the poet Namık Kemal also wrote the important 1876 novel İntibâh (Awakening), while the journalist İbrahim Şinasi is noted for writing, in 1860, the first modern Turkish play, the one-act comedy "Şair Evlenmesi" (The Poet's Marriage). Most of the roots of modern Turkish literature were formed between the years 1896 and 1923. Broadly, there were three primary literary movements during this period: the Edebiyyât-ı Cedîde (New Literature) movement; the Fecr-i Âtî (Dawn of the Future) movement; and the Millî Edebiyyât (National Literature) movement. The Edebiyyât-ı Cedîde (New Literature) movement began with the founding in 1891 of the magazine Servet-i Fünûn (Scientific Wealth), which was largely devoted to progress (both intellectual and scientific) along the Western model. Accordingly, the magazine's literary ventures, under the direction of the poet Tevfik Fikret, were geared towards creating a Western-style "high art" in Turkey.

Poetry

Poetry is the most dominant form of literature in modern Turkey.

The 'folk poetry' as indicated above, was strongly influenced by the Islamic Sunni and Shi'a traditions. Furthermore, as partly evidenced by the prevalence of the still-existent ashik ("aşık" or "ozan") tradition, the dominant element in Turkish folk poetry has always been song. The development of folk poetry in Turkish—which began to emerge in the 13th century with such important writers as Yunus Emre, Sultan Veled, and Şeyyâd Hamza—was given a great boost when, on 13 May 1277, Karamanoğlu Mehmed Bey declared Turkish the official state language of Anatolia's powerful Karamanid state; subsequently, many of the tradition's greatest poets would continue to emerge from this region.

There are, broadly speaking, two traditions of Turkish folk poetries;

 the aşık/ozan tradition, which—although much influenced by religion, as mentioned above—was, for the most part, a secular tradition; 
 the explicitly religious tradition, which emerged from the gathering places (tekkes) of the Sufi religious orders and Shi'a groups. 
Much of the poetry and song of the aşık/ozan tradition, being almost exclusively oral until the 19th century, remains anonymous. There are, however, a few well-known aşıks from before that time whose names have survived together with their works: the aforementioned Köroğlu (16th century); Karacaoğlan (1606?–1689?), who may be the best-known of the pre-19th century aşıks; Dadaloğlu (1785?–1868?), who was one of the last of the great aşıks before the tradition began to dwindle somewhat in the late 19th century; and several others. The aşıks were essentially minstrels who traveled through Anatolia performing their songs on the bağlama, a mandolin-like instrument whose paired strings are considered to have a symbolic religious significance in Alevi/Bektashi culture. Despite the decline of the aşık/ozan tradition in the 19th century, it experienced a significant revival in the 20th century thanks to such outstanding figures as Aşık Veysel Şatıroğlu (1894–1973), Aşık Mahzuni Şerif (1938–2002), Neşet Ertaş (1938–2012), and many others.

Ottoman Divan poetry was a highly ritualized and symbolic art form. From the Persian poetry that largely inspired it, it inherited a wealth of symbols whose meanings and interrelationships—both of similitude (مراعات نظير mura'ât-i nazîr / تناسب tenâsüb) and opposition (تضاد tezâd)—were more or less prescribed. Examples of prevalent symbols that, to some extent, oppose one another include, among others:

the nightingale (بلبل bülbül) — the rose (ﮔل gül) 
the world (جهان cihan; عالم 'âlem) — the rosegarden (ﮔﻠﺴﺘﺎن gülistan; ﮔﻠﺸﻦ gülşen) 
the ascetic (زاهد zâhid) — the dervish (درويش derviş)

In the early years of the Republic of Turkey, there were a number of poetic trends. Authors such as Ahmed Hâşim and Yahyâ Kemâl Beyatlı (1884–1958) continued to write important formal verse whose language was, to a great extent, a continuation of the late Ottoman tradition. By far the majority of the poetry of the time, however, was in the tradition of the folk-inspired "syllabist" movement (Five Syllabists or Beş Hececiler), which had emerged from the National Literature movement and which tended to express patriotic themes couched in the syllabic meter associated with Turkish folk poetry.

The first radical step away from this trend was taken by Nâzım Hikmet, who—during his time as a student in the Soviet Union from 1921 to 1924—was exposed to the modernist poetry of Vladimir Mayakovsky and others, which inspired him to start writing verse in a less formal style.

Another revolution in Turkish poetry came about in 1941 with the publication of a small volume of verse preceded by an essay and entitled Garip (meaning both "miserable" and "strange"). The authors were Orhan Veli Kanık (1914–1950), Melih Cevdet Anday (1915–2002), and Oktay Rifat (1914–1988). Explicitly opposing themselves to everything that had gone in poetry before, they sought instead to create a popular art, "to explore the people's tastes, to determine them, and to make them reign supreme over art".[21] To this end, and inspired in part by contemporary French poets like Jacques Prévert, they employed not only a variant of the free verse introduced by Nâzım Hikmet, but also highly colloquial language, and wrote primarily about mundane daily subjects and the ordinary man on the street. The reaction was immediate and polarized: most of the academic establishment and older poets vilified them, while much of the Turkish population embraced them wholeheartedly.

Just as the Garip movement was a reaction against earlier poetry, so—in the 1950s and afterwards—was there a reaction against the Garip movement. The poets of this movement, soon known as İkinci Yeni ("Second New"[22]), opposed themselves to the social aspects prevalent in the poetry of Nâzım Hikmet and the Garip poets, and instead—partly inspired by the disruption of language in such Western movements as Dada and Surrealism—sought to create a more abstract poetry through the use of jarring and unexpected language, complex images, and the association of ideas. To some extent, the movement can be seen as bearing some of the characteristics of postmodern literature. The best-known poets writing in the "Second New" vein were Turgut Uyar (1927–1985), Edip Cansever (1928–1986), Cemal Süreya (1931–1990), Ece Ayhan (1931–2002), and İlhan Berk (1918–2008).

Outside of the Garip and "Second New" movements also, a number of significant poets have flourished, such as Fazıl Hüsnü Dağlarca (1914–2008), who wrote poems dealing with fundamental concepts like life, death, God, time, and the cosmos; Behçet Necatigil (1916–1979), whose somewhat allegorical poems explore the significance of middle-class daily life; Can Yücel (1926–1999), who—in addition to his own highly colloquial and varied poetry—was also a translator into Turkish of a variety of world literature; and İsmet Özel (1944– ), whose early poetry was highly leftist but whose poetry since the 1970s has shown a strong mystical and even Islamist influence.

Prose

The style of the current novelists can be traced back to the Genç Kalemler journal in the Ottoman period. Young Pens was published in Selanik under Ömer Seyfettin, Ziya Gökalp and Ali Canip Yöntem. They covered the social and political concepts of their time with the nationalistic perspective. They were the core of a movement which became known as the "national literature."

With the declaration of the Turkish Republic in 1923, Turkish literature became interested in folkloric styles. This was also the first time since the 19th century that Turkish literature was escaping from Western influence and began to mix Western forms with other forms. During the 1930s, Yakup Kadri Karaosmanoğlu and Vedat Nedim Tor published Kadro, which was revolutionary in its view of life.

Stylistically, the early prose of the Republic of Turkey was essentially a continuation of the National Literature movement, with Realism and Naturalism predominating. This trend culminated in the 1932 novel Yaban (The Wilds) by Yakup Kadri Karaosmanoğlu. This novel can be seen as the precursor to two trends that would soon develop: social realism, and the "village novel" (köy romanı). The social realist movement was led by the short-story writer Sait Faik Abasıyanık. The major writers of the "village novel" tradition were Kemal Tahir, Orhan Kemal, and Yaşar Kemal. In a very different tradition, but evincing a similar strong political viewpoint, was the satirical short-story writer Aziz Nesin. Other important novelists of this period were Ahmet Hamdi Tanpınar and Oğuz Atay. Orhan Pamuk, winner of the 2006 Nobel Prize in Literature, is among the innovative novelists, whose works show the influence of postmodernism and magic realism. Important poets of the Republic of Turkey period include Ahmet Haşim, Yahya Kemal Beyatlı and Nâzım Hikmet (who introduced the free verse style). Orhan Veli Kanık, Melih Cevdet Anday and Oktay Rifat led the Garip movement; while Turgut Uyar, Edip Cansever and Cemal Süreya led the İkinci Yeni movement. Outside of the Garip and İkinci Yeni movements, a number of other significant poets such as Fazıl Hüsnü Dağlarca, Behçet Necatigil and Can Yücel also flourished.

Orhan Pamuk is a leading Turkish novelist of post-modern literature. His works have been translated into more than twenty languages. He is the recipient of major Turkish and international literary awards, such as the 2006 Nobel Prize in Literature.

Architecture

Early architecture (1299–1437)

Early Ottoman period (1299–1326)
With the establishment of the Ottoman Empire, the years 1300–1453 constitute the early or first Ottoman period in architecture, when Ottoman art was in search of new ideas. This period witnessed three types of mosques: tiered, single-domed and subline-angled mosques. The Hacı Özbek Mosque (1333) in İznik, the first important center of Ottoman art, is the first example of an Ottoman single-domed mosque.

Bursa period (1326–1437)
The domed architectural style evolved from Bursa and Edirne. The Grand Mosque of Bursa was the first Seljuk mosque to be converted into a domed one. Edirne (Adrianople) was the Ottoman capital between 1365 and 1453, when Istanbul (Constantinople) became the new capital, and it is here that we witness the final stages in the architectural development which culminated in the construction of the great mosques of Istanbul. The buildings constructed in Istanbul during the period between the Turkish conquest of the city in 1453 and the construction of the Istanbul Bayezid II Mosque are also considered works of the early period. Among these are the Fatih Mosque (1470), Mahmut Paşa Mosque, the tiled palace and Topkapı Palace. The Ottomans integrated mosques into the community and added soup kitchens, theological schools, hospitals, Turkish baths and tombs.

Classical period (1437–1703)

During the classical period, mosque plans changed to include inner and outer courtyards. The inner courtyard and the mosque were inseparable. The master architect of the classical period, Mimar Sinan, was born in 1492 in Kayseri and died in Istanbul in the year 1588. Sinan started a new era in world architecture, creating 334 buildings in various cities. Mimar Sinan's first important work was the Şehzade Mosque, completed in 1548. His second significant work was the Süleymaniye Mosque and the surrounding complex, built for Suleiman the Magnificent. The Selimiye Mosque in Edirne was built during the years 1568–74, when Sinan was in his prime as an architect. The Rüstem Pasha Mosque, Mihrimah Sultan Mosque, Ibrahim Pasha Mosque, and the Şehzade Mosque, as well as the türbes (mausoleum) of Suleiman the Magnificent, Roxelana and Selim II are among Sinan's most renowned works. Most classical period designs used the Byzantine architecture of the neighboring Balkans as its base, and from there, ethnic elements were added, creating a different architectural style.

Examples of Ottoman architecture of the classical period, aside from Turkey, can also be seen in the Balkans, Hungary, Egypt, Tunisia and Algiers, where mosques, bridges, fountains and schools were built.

Westernization period (1703–1876)

During the reign of Ahmed III (1703–1730) and under the impetus of his grand vizier İbrahim Paşa, a period of peace ensued. Due to the close relations between the Ottoman Empire and France, Ottoman architecture began to be influenced by the Baroque and Rococo styles that were popular in Europe. A style that was very similar to Baroque was developed by the Seljuk Turks, according to a number of academics. Examples of the creation of this art form can be witnessed in the Divriği Hospital and Mosque, which is a UNESCO world heritage site, as well as in the Sivas Çifte Minare, Konya İnce Minare museums and many other buildings from the Seljuk period in Anatolia. It is often called the "Seljuk Baroque portal." From here it emerged again in Italy, and later grew in popularity among the Turks during the Ottoman era. Various visitors and envoys were sent to European cities, especially to Paris, to experience the contemporary European customs and life. The decorative elements of the European Baroque and Rococo influenced even the religious Ottoman architecture. On the other hand, Mellin, a French architect, was invited by a sister of Sultan Selim III to Istanbul and depicted the Bosporus shores and the seaside waterfront mansions called yalı. During a thirty-year period known as the Tulip period, all eyes were turned to the West, and instead of monumental and classical works, villas and pavilions were built around Istanbul. However, it was about this time when the construction on the Ishak Pasha Palace (1685–1784) in Eastern Anatolia was going on.

Tulip period (1703–1757)

Beginning with this period, the upper class and the elites in the Ottoman Empire started to use the open and public areas frequently. The traditional, introverted manner of the society began to change. Fountains and waterside residences such as the Aynalıkavak Kasrı became popular. A water canal (other name is Cetvel-i Sim) and a picnic area (Kağıthane) were established as recreational areas. Although the Tulip period ended with the Patrona Halil uprising, it became a model for attitudes of Westernization. During the years 1720–1890, Ottoman architecture deviated from the principles of classical times. With Ahmed III's deposition, Mahmud I took the throne (1730–1754). It was during this period that Baroque-style mosques were starting to be constructed.

Baroque period (1757–1808)
Circular, wavy and curved lines are predominant in the structures of this period. Major examples are the Nur-u Osmaniye Mosque, Zeynep Sultan Mosque, Laleli Mosque, Fatih Tomb, Laleli Çukurçeşme Inn, Birgi Çakırağa Mansion, Aynalıkavak Palace, and the Selimiye Barracks. Mimar Tahir (also known as Mehmed Tahir Ağa) was the important architect of this period.

Empire period (1808–1876)
Nusretiye Mosque, Ortaköy Mosque, Sultan Mahmud's Tomb, Galata Lodge of the Mevlevi Dervishes, Dolmabahçe Palace, Beylerbeyi Palace, Sadullah Pasha Yalı and the Kuleli Barracks are the important examples of this style, developed parallel with the Westernization process. Architects from the Balyan family were the leading ones of the time. This period was marked by buildings of mixed Neo-Classical, Baroque, Rococo and Empire styles, such as the Dolmabahçe Palace, Dolmabahçe Mosque and Ortaköy Mosque.

Late Ottoman period (1876–1922)
Pertevniyal Valide Sultan Mosque, Şeyh Zafir Group of Buildings, Haydarpaşa School of Medicine, Duyun-u Umumiye Building, Istanbul Title Deed Office, large Post Office buildings such as the Merkez Postane (Central Post Office) in Istanbul's Sirkeci district, and the Harikzedegan Apartments in Laleli are the important structures of this period when an eclectic style was dominant. Raimondo Tommaso D'Aronco and Alexander Vallaury were the leading architects of the time.

Republican era

In the first years of the Turkish Republic, founded in 1923, Turkish architecture was influenced by Ottoman architecture, in particular during the First National Architectural Movement. However, from the 1930s, architectural styles started to differ from traditional architecture, also as a result of an increasing number of foreign architects being invited to work in the country, mostly from Germany and Austria. The Second World War was a period of isolation, during which the Second National Architectural Movement emerged. Similar to Fascist architecture, the movement aimed to create modern but nationalistic architecture.

Starting from the 1950s, isolation from the rest of the world started to diminish, leading to Turkish architects being increasingly inspired by their counterparts in the rest of the world. However they were constrained by the lack of technological infrastructure or insufficient financial resources till the 1980s. Thereafter, the liberalization of the economy and the shift towards export-led growth, paved the way for the private sector to become the leading influence on architecture.

Cinema

Turkish film directors have won numerous prestigious awards in the recent years. Nuri Bilge Ceylan won the Best Director Award at the 2008 Cannes Film Festival with the film Üç Maymun. This was the fourth time that Ceylan received an award at Cannes, following the awards for the film Uzak (which was also nominated for the Golden Palm) at the festival of 2003 and 2004, and the film İklimler (also nominated for the Golden Palm) at the 2006 Cannes Film Festival. These three films, along with the other important works of Ceylan such as Kasaba (1997) and Mayıs sıkıntısı (1999) have also won awards at the other major international film festivals; including the Angers European First Film Festival (1997 and 1999), Ankara Film Festival (2000), Antalya Golden Orange Film Festival (1999, 2002 and 2006), Bergamo Film Meeting (2001), Berlin Film Festival (1998), Brothers Manaki Film Festival (2003), Buenos Aires International Festival of Independent Cinema (2001), Cannes Film Festival (2003, 2004 and 2006), Chicago Film Festival (2003), Cinemanila Film Festival (2003), European Film Awards (2000), Istanbul Film Festival (1998, 2000, 2003 and 2007), Mexico City Film Festival (2004), Montpellier Mediterranean Film Festival (2003), San Sebastián Film Festival (2003), Singapore Film Festival (2001), Sofia Film Festival (2004), Tokyo Film Festival (1998) and the Trieste Film Festival (2004).

More recently, Semih Kaplanoğlu won the Golden Bear at the 60th Berlin International Film Festival with his Honey (2010 film); the third and final installment of the "Yusuf Trilogy", which includes Egg and Milk. This was the second time a Turkish film wins the award; first one being Susuz Yaz by Metin Erksan in 1964.

Turkish film director Fatih Akın, who lives in Germany and has dual Turkish-German citizenship, won the Golden Bear Award at the 2004 Berlin Film Festival with the film Head-On. The film won numerous other awards in many international film festivals. Fatih Akın was nominated for the Golden Palm and won the Best Screenplay Award at the 2007 Cannes Film Festival; as well as the Golden Orange at the 2007 Antalya Film Festival; the Lino Brocka Award at the 2007 Cinemanila Film Festival; the Best Screenwriter award at the 2007 European Film Awards; the Best Direction, Best Screenplay and Outstanding Feature Film awards at the 2008 German Film Awards; the Best Feature Film and Best Screenplay awards at the 2008 RiverRun Film Festival; the 2008 Bavarian Film Award; and the Lux Prize by the European Parliament, with the film The Edge of Heaven. Other important films of Akın, such as Kurz und schmerzlos (1998), In July (2000), Solino (2002), and Crossing the Bridge: The Sound of Istanbul (2005) won numerous awards.

Another famous Turkish film director is Ferzan Özpetek, whose films like Hamam (1997), Harem suaré (1999), Le Fate Ignoranti (2001), La finestra di fronte (2003), Cuore Sacro (2005) and Saturno contro (2007) won him international fame and awards. The film La finestra di fronte (2003) was particularly successful, winning the Best Film and Scholars Jury awards at the 2003 David di Donatello Awards, the Crystal Globe and Best Director awards at the 2003 Karlovy Vary International Film Festival, the 2003 Silver Ribbon for Best Original Story from the Italian National Syndicate of Film Journalists, the Festival Prize at the 2004 Foyle Film Festival, the Audience Award at the 2004 Rehoboth Beach Independent Film Festival, and the Canvas Audience Award at the 2004 Flanders International Film Festival.

Sports

The traditional Turkish national sport has been the Yağlı güreş (Oiled Wrestling) since Ottoman times. The annual international yağlı güreş (oiled wrestling) tournament that's held in Kırkpınar near Edirne is the oldest continuously running, sanctioned sporting competition in the world, having taken place every year since 1362.

The most popular sport in Turkey is football. Turkey's top teams include Fenerbahçe, Galatasaray and Beşiktaş. In 2000, Galatasaray cemented its role as a major European club by winning the UEFA Cup and UEFA Super Cup. Two years later the Turkish national team finished third in the 2002 FIFA World Cup held in Japan and South Korea, while in 2008 the national team reached the semi-finals of the UEFA Euro 2008 competition.

Other mainstream sports such as basketball and volleyball are also popular. Turkey hosted the 2010 FIBA World Championship international basketball tournament and reached the final. The men's national basketball team finished second in Eurobasket 2001; while Efes Pilsen S.K. won the Korać Cup in 1996, finished second in the Saporta Cup of 1993, and made it to the Final Four of Euroleague and Suproleague in 2000 and 2001. Turkish basketball players have also been successful in the NBA. In June 2004, Mehmet Okur won the 2004 NBA Championship with the Detroit Pistons, becoming the first Turkish player to win an NBA title. Okur was selected to the Western Conference All-Star Team for the 2007 NBA All-Star Game, also becoming the first Turkish player to participate in this event. Another successful Turkish player in the NBA is Hidayet Türkoğlu, who was given the NBA's Most Improved Player Award for the 2007–2008 season, on April 28, 2008. Basketball has received further attention and media coverage in 2010s with Fenerbahce Basketball and Anadolu Efes S.K. making 6 straight Euroleague Final Four appearances combined, along with winning the Euroleague title in 2017 and 2021 respectively. Women's volleyball teams such as Eczacıbaşı, Vakıfbank, and Fenerbahçe have been the most successful by far in any team sport, winning numerous European championship titles and medals.

Motorsports have become popular recently, especially following the inclusion of the Rally of Turkey to the FIA World Rally Championship calendar in 2003, and the inclusion of the Turkish Grand Prix to the Formula One racing calendar in 2005. Other important annual motorsports events which are held at the Istanbul Park racing circuit include the MotoGP Grand Prix of Turkey, the FIA World Touring Car Championship, the GP2 Series and the Le Mans Series. From time to time Istanbul and Antalya also host the Turkish leg of the F1 Powerboat Racing championship; while the Turkish leg of the Red Bull Air Race World Series, an air racing competition, takes place above the Golden Horn in Istanbul. Surfing, snowboarding, skateboarding, paragliding, and other extreme sports are becoming more popular every year.

International wrestling styles governed by FILA such as Freestyle wrestling and Greco-Roman wrestling are also popular, with many European, World and Olympic championship titles won by Turkish wrestlers both individually and as a national team. Another major sport in which the Turks have been internationally successful is weightlifting; as Turkish weightlifters, both male and female, have broken numerous world records and won several European, World and Olympic championship titles. Naim Süleymanoğlu and Halil Mutlu have achieved legendary status as one of the few weightlifters to have won three gold medals in three Olympics.

Turkey hosted the 2005 Summer Universiade in İzmir and the 2011 Winter Universiade in Erzurum.

Cuisine

Turkish cuisine inherited its Ottoman heritage which could be described as a fusion and refinement of Turkic and Persian cuisines. Turkish cuisine also influenced Greek, Armenian, Arabic, Persian, Balkan and Middle East cuisines and other neighbouring cuisines, as well as western European cuisines. Ottomans fused various culinary traditions of their realm with influences from Middle Eastern cuisines, along with traditional Turkic elements from Central Asia such as yogurt. The Ottoman Empire indeed created a vast array of technical specialities. It can be observed that various regions of the Ottoman Empire contain bits and pieces of the vast Ottoman dishes. 
Taken as a whole, Turkish cuisine is not homogenous. Aside from common Turkish specialities which can be found throughout the country, there are also region-specific specialities. The Black Sea region's cuisine (northern Turkey) is based on corn and anchovies. The southeast—Urfa, Gaziantep and Adana—is famous for its kebabs, mezes and dough-based desserts such as baklava, kadayıf and künefe. Especially in the western parts of Turkey, where olive trees are grown abundantly, olive oil is the major type of oil used for cooking. The cuisines of the Aegean, Marmara and Mediterranean regions display basic characteristics of Mediterranean cuisine as they are rich in vegetables, herbs and fish. Central Anatolia is famous for its pastry specialities such as keşkek (kashkak), mantı (especially of Kayseri) and gözleme.

The name of specialities sometimes includes the name of a city or a region (either in Turkey or outside). This suggests that a dish is a speciality of that area, or may refer to the specific technique or ingredients used in that area. For example, the difference between Urfa kebab and Adana kebab is the use of garlic instead of onion and the larger amount of hot pepper that kebab contains.

Festivals
Christmas is known in Turkish as Noel, although the majority of the Turks do not celebrate it as such, the idea is not thoroughly an alien one. The festivity traces its roots where Santa Claus was born in Turkey and is known as Noel Baba. It has for a long time been a tradition that Noel Baba would bring gifts to children on New Year's Eve.

Religion

See also

 Turkish folklore
 Public holidays in Turkey
 Bayram (Turkey)
 Education in Turkey
 Tourism in Turkey
 Public holidays in Turkey
 Museums in Turkey
 Minorities in Turkey
 List of museums in Turkey
 Cornucopia (magazine)
 History of Turkey
 Reforms in the Ottoman Empire
Meyhane
Hammam
Victorian Turkish bath
Kilim
Kilim motifs
Ottoman culture
Turquerie
Orientalism
Video games in Turkey
Turkish draughts
Turkish archery
Books published per country per year Turkey, 12th & 13th

Notes and references

External links
 Turkish Culture Portal
 Turkey Culture 
 Turkey Live Culture 
 Traditions in Turkey 
 Online Turkish Culture TV
 Art and Culture of Turkey
 ATON, the Uysal-Walker Archive of Turkish Oral Narrative at Texas Tech University
 Turkish Live Tv
 Turkey Tourism
 Gezi Rehberi
 "Life and Culture in Turkey" (Study in Turkey)

Turkish culture
Turkic culture